In the 2020–21 season, JS Kabylie is competing in the Ligue 1 for the 52nd season, as well as the Algerian League Cup. It is their 52nd consecutive season in the top flight of Algerian football. They will be competing in Ligue 1 and the Confederation Cup.

Squad list
Players and squad numbers last updated on 15 November 2020.Note: Flags indicate national team as has been defined under FIFA eligibility rules. Players may hold more than one non-FIFA nationality.

Pre-season

Competitions

Overview

{| class="wikitable" style="text-align: center"
|-
!rowspan=2|Competition
!colspan=8|Record
!rowspan=2|Started round
!rowspan=2|Final position / round
!rowspan=2|First match
!rowspan=2|Last match
|-
!
!
!
!
!
!
!
!
|-
| Ligue 1

| 
| 5th
| 27 November 2020
| 28 August 2021
|-
| League Cup

| Round of 16
| style="background:gold;"| Winners
| 8 May 2021
| 10 August 2021
|-
| Confederation Cup

| Preliminary round
| style="background:silver;"| Runners–up
| 22 December 2020
| 10 July 2021
|-
! Total

Ligue 1

League table

Results summary

Results by round

Matches
On 22 October 2020, the Algerian Ligue Professionnelle 1 fixtures were announced.

League Cup

Confederation Cup

First round

Play-off round

Group stage

Group B

knockout stage

Quarter-finals

Semi-finals

Final

Squad information

Playing statistics

|-

|-
! colspan=12 style=background:#dcdcdc; text-align:center| Players transferred out during the season

Goalscorers
Includes all competitive matches. The list is sorted alphabetically by surname when total goals are equal.

Transfers

In

Out

Notes

References

2020-21
Algerian football clubs 2020–21 season